Paul William George Hurry (born 9 April 1975 in Canterbury, Kent) is a former motorcycle speedway rider from England.

Career
Hurry began his racing career aged 16 with the Arena Essex Hammers in 1991. In 1994 he became British under 21 champion and in 2000 he finished in second place at the British Speedway Championship. Hurry was selected to represent the Great Britain national speedway team at the 2001 Speedway World Cup Race-off, but the team failed to reach the final. After spells with various British clubs, Hurry returned to Arena Essex in 2004, where he stayed until 2007. 

He appeared to have retired from racing in 2007 due to ongoing problems with an arm injury, but returned to Elite League racing in 2009 to replace the injured Kyle Legault for Poole Pirates. In 2010, Hurry returned to ride for his first club, now renamed the Lakeside Hammers. Paul suffered horrific leg injuries in the final of the 2010 European Grasstrack Final at La Reole and didn't return to racing until 2015. In that time away from the sport he has become a member of the ACU Track Racing Committee and has also become a 'Clerk of the Course'. He has also become a prominent member

British Speedway Championship
Finalist

 1994  @ Coventry 2pts (16th)
 1995  @ Coventry 4pts (9th)
 1998  @ Coventry 12pts (13th)
 1999  @ Coventry 10pts (9th)
 2000  @ Coventry 13pts (10th)
 2001  @ Coventry 8pts (8th)
 2002  @ Coventry Coventry 7pts (9th)
 2003  @ Eastbourne 5pts (13th)
 2006  @ Belle Vue 7pts (9th)

World Longtrack Championship

Finalist

1996 - Herxheim 3pts (18th)

Grand-Prix Years

 1997 - Five G.P. 51pts (11th)
 1998 - One G.P. 20pts (16th)
 1999 - Five G.P. 72pts (5th)
 2000 - Five G.P. 77pts (4th)
 2001 - Four G.P. 46pts (4th)
 2002 - Four G.P. 40pts (8th)
 2003 - Four G.P. 58pts (8th)
 2005 - Four G.P. 58pts (3rd)
 2007 - Two G.P. 22pts (12th)

Best Individual G.P. Results

   Marmande First 1997, 1999; Second 2003, 2005
   Abingdon Second 1998; Third 2000.
   Eenrum Third 2000.
   Morizes Third 2005.
   St Macaire Third 2007

European Grasstrack Championship

Finals

 1994 -   Cloppenburg 7pts (10th)
 1995 -   Joure 16pts (4th)
 1996 -   Saint-Colomb-de-Lauzun 13pts (6th)
 2002 -   Berghaupten 15pts (4th)
 2004 -   Eenrum 7pts (12th)
 2005 -   Schwarme 18pts (Champion)
 2009 -   Berghaupten 4pts (14th)
 2010 -   La Reole 15pts (6th)
 2017 -   Hertingan 9pts (12th)
 2018 -   Tayac 5pts (12th)
 2019 -   Bad Hersfeld 15thpts (Second)

Best Other Results

   Abingdon Preliminary Round First 1994.
   Aduard Semi-final First 1994.
   Hertingan Semi-final Third 2009.
   La Reole Semi-final First 2002.
   Noordwolde Semi-final First 2003, 2005.
   Saint-Colomb-de-Lauzun Semi-final First 2001.
   St MacaireSemi-final Third 2017.
   Stadskanaal Preliminary Round First 1996.
   Truro Semi-final First 2010.

British Grasstrack Championship
 Top Three Finishes 

 2000 Runner-up
 2001 Podium
 2002 Champion
 2004 Champion
 2005 Champion
 2007 Runner-up

References

British speedway riders
1975 births
Living people
Eastbourne Eagles riders
Ipswich Witches riders
Lakeside Hammers riders
Kent Kings riders
King's Lynn Stars riders
Oxford Cheetahs riders
Peterborough Panthers riders
Poole Pirates riders
Wolverhampton Wolves riders
Individual Speedway Long Track World Championship riders